T. Edward (Ted) Vives originated the FSU Seminole War Chant in 1985, a trombonist and composer, is the musical director of the Los Alamos Community Winds.

Originally from Auburn, Alabama, Dr. Vives began music studies at the age of 4, taking piano and theory lessons from Edgar and Dorothy Glyde. His musical interests changed to trombone performance and composition upon entering the public school system. Vives holds bachelor's degrees in both composition and music education from Florida State University where he studied with John Boda, Roy Johnson, and Charles Carter. He also holds a Masters of Music in Composition and a Ph.D. in Music Education from the University of Florida where he studied with Budd Udell and John D. White.

He is a member of Kappa Kappa Psi National Band Service Fraternity (Gamma Nu chapter, Florida State University) Phi Mu Alpha Sinfonia, (Epsilon Iota chapter, Florida State University) and Tau Beta Sigma (honorary member, Alpha Omega chapter, Florida State University) and Phi Kappa Phi Honor Society.

He has taught in the public schools in Florida and has served as a clinician at band and music camps in many states. His marching and concert band arrangements have been performed nationwide. In 2003 and 2010 he was selected as the Professional Music Teachers of New Mexico's (Music Teachers National Association State Affiliate) Commissioned Composer.

He is the winner of the 2011 American Prize in Composition (Choral Division);

Dr. Vives’ compositions and arrangements are published by Manduca Music Publications and Survives Music. He performs as principal trombone with both the Los Alamos Symphony and the Santa Fe Community Orchestra.
Additionally, he teaches low brass instruments privately.

Works

Orchestra

Introduction and Overture (From Palms to Poplars) (2002)
Symphony No. 1 (2005)
Tombeé de la Nuit (2005
Absence (2005)
Wedding Suite (2006)
Children's Suite (2007)
Fanfare de melodías populares de Nuevo México (2009)
Kilmartin Glen - A Sculpture in Stones (2009)

Concert band

Hilltopper Zia March (2000)
...and they pealed more loud and deep. (2003) Winner of the 2003 North Cheshire Concert Band Composition Competition;
For the Fair and the Brave (2004)
The Los Alamos Firefighters March (2011)
N.B.I. (2012)
...and they named it Trinity (2013)

Vocal, Choral, and Opera

Riddles (1993) Opera based on J.R.R. Tolkien's The Hobbit
Borean Visions (1995) for Concert Band and Chorus
Verbum Continuum (1997) for Soprano, Alto Saxophone, and Piano
Reflections of '63 (1997) for Tenor, Trumpet, Violoncello, Guitar, and Percussion
Circaré (1998)
Vigil Mass for the Risen Lord (2002, rev. 2012)
Lux Aeterna (2008) Runner-up in the 2009 Sacra Profana Choral Composition Competition
Castrovalva (2009)
The Soldier (2011)
elegy (2012)
Nursery Rhymes (2012)
Premonition (2012)

Chamber music

Woodwind Quintet No. 1 (Four for Five) (1994)
Delineations (1998) for Trombone and Piano
Brass Quintet (2002)
Elan con Brio (2003) for Bassoon, Trombone, and Piano Duo
Undisonus Praeconare (2003) for Brass Ensemble
Episode an Ailes (2006) for Flute Choir
Fete (2009) for Piano Duo
The Music Lesson (2010) for Soprano, 2 Trombones, and Piano
Bittersweet Covenant (2011) for Alto Saxophone, String Quartet, and Piano

External links
http://www.survivesmusic.net
http://www.lacw.org

References

American classical trombonists
Male trombonists
People from Auburn, Alabama
Living people
Auburn High School (Alabama) alumni
Florida State University alumni
University of Florida alumni
21st-century classical trombonists
21st-century American male musicians
Year of birth missing (living people)